Simona Stoyanova (born 28 March 2004) is a Bulgarian footballer who plays as a midfielder for Women's National Championship club FC Etar Veliko Tarnovo and the Bulgaria women's national team.

International career
Stoyanova capped for Bulgaria at senior level in a 0–6 friendly loss to Croatia on 14 June 2019.

References

2004 births
Living people
Women's association football midfielders
Bulgarian women's footballers
Bulgaria women's international footballers